Watson Peaks is a linear group of peaks that trend in a NW-SE direction for 9 nautical miles (17 km), located 2 nautical miles (3.7 km) northeast of Rivera Peaks, in Palmer Land. Mapped by United States Geological Survey (USGS) from surveys and U.S. Navy air photos, 1961–67. Named by Advisory Committee on Antarctic Names (US-ACAN) for George E. Watson, biologist on the Palmer Station-Eastwind Expedition, summer 1965–66; author of the handbook Birds of the Antarctic and Sub-Antarctic, 1975.

Mountains of Palmer Land